This disambiguation page is on grammatical Hebrew accents.  For dialects, see Hebrew dialects (disambiguation).

There are two types of Hebrew accents that go on Hebrew letters:

 Niqqud, a system of diacritical signs used to represent vowels or distinguish between alternative pronunciations of letters 
 Hebrew cantillation, used for the ritual chanting of readings from the Bible in synagogue services